Jaski may refer to the following places in Poland:
Jaski, Lublin Voivodeship
Jaski, Podlaskie Voivodeship
Jaśki, Podlaskie Voivodeship
Jaśki, Warmian-Masurian Voivodeship